The plumbeous hawk (Cryptoleucopteryx plumbea) is a species of bird of prey in the family Accipitridae.

Distribution
It is found in Colombia, Ecuador, Panama, and Peru.
Its natural habitat is subtropical or tropical moist lowland forests.
It is threatened by habitat loss.

References

External links

plumbeous hawk
Birds of Colombia
Birds of the Tumbes-Chocó-Magdalena
Birds of prey of South America
plumbeous hawk
plumbeous hawk
Taxonomy articles created by Polbot